Alfred Peter Lythgoe (16 March 1907 – 17 April 1967) was an English professional footballer who played as a forward for Stockport County and Huddersfield Town in the 1930s, before becoming manager of Altrincham in 1953.

Career

Lythgoe began his career with Crewe Alexandra but was released by the club after they deemed him too small. He moved into non-league football with spells at Whitchurch, Congleton and Sandbach before he attracted the attention of Division Three North side Stockport County while playing for Ashton National in 1932.

After scoring 19 goals in his first season, the following year Lythgoe scored 46 goals in 39 league games, which is still a club record, including three consecutive hat-tricks in matches against Southport, Darlington and Wrexham and, after starting the 1934–35 season in similar fashion, Huddersfield Town paid £3,500 to take him to Leeds Road in October 1934. He later returned to Stockport in 1938 where he finished his playing career.

He died on 17 April 1967, aged 60.

References

1907 births
1967 deaths
English footballers
English football managers
English Football League players
Association football forwards
People from Nantwich
Ashton National F.C. players
Stockport County F.C. players
Huddersfield Town A.F.C. players
Congleton Town F.C. players
Altrincham F.C. managers
English Football League representative players
Sportspeople from Cheshire